Hithadhoo School (Dhivehi : ހިތަދޫ ސުކޫލް ) is a public high school located in Hithadhoo, Addu City, Maldives. The English language is used in teaching all classes except Dhivehi and Islam, which are taught in Dhivehi.

References

Schools in the Maldives